Chishmy is the name of several inhabited localities in the Republic of Bashkortostan, Russia.

Modern localities
Urban localities
Chishmy, a work settlement in Chishminsky District; 

Rural localities
Chishmy, Chishminsky Selsoviet, Chishminsky District, Republic of Bashkortostan, a selo in Chishminsky Selsoviet of Chishminsky District
Chishmy, Miyakinsky District, Republic of Bashkortostan, a village in Urshakbashkaramalinsky Selsoviet of Miyakinsky District;

Alternative names
Chishmy, alternative name of Chishma, a village in Kuzeyevsky Selsoviet of Buzdyaksky District; 
Chishmy, alternative name of Chishma, a village in Adzitarovsky Selsoviet of Karmaskalinsky District; 
Chishmy, alternative name of Chishma, a selo in Ismailovsky Selsoviet of Dyurtyulinsky District;

See also
Chishma

References